The Electric Grandmother is a television movie that originally aired January 17, 1982, on NBC as a 60-minute Project Peacock special, based on the 1969 science fiction short story "I Sing the Body Electric" by Ray Bradbury. It stars Maureen Stapleton and Edward Herrmann and was directed by Noel Black. Bradbury's story was originally written as a teleplay in 1962 as "I Sing the Body Electric", an episode of The Twilight Zone. The film was distributed on VHS by Coronet Video.

Plot

A widower purchases an android built in the form of a grandmother as a surrogate to his three children, Tom, Timothy and Agatha.  The two boys accept the gynoid grandmother but Agatha does not until she saves her life.  When the children have grown up, and no longer need her, the grandmother returns to the factory where she was built and spends time with other electric grandmothers no longer needed.  She is recalled to service to help the elderly Tom, Timothy and Agatha.

Cast
Maureen Stapleton as Grandmother
Edward Herrmann as Father
Paul Benedict as Guido Fantoccini
Tara Kennedy as Agatha
Robert MacNaughton as Tom
Charlie Fields as Timothy
Madeleine Sherwood as Aunt Clara

Awards
The Electric Grandmother received an Emmy Award nomination for Outstanding Children's Program, and won a Peabody Award. It has been recognized by Chicago International Children's Film Festival, International Film Festival for Children and Youth, American Film Festival and the Southern California Motion Picture Council. Additionally, 10-year-old actress Tara Kennedy was nominated for a Young Artist Award in the category Best Young Actress in a Movie Made for Television.

Reviews
"Devotees of science fiction of any age, in school classes or public library programs, will find it a fascinating interpretation of Bradbury's fiction." — School Library Journal

References in popular culture
Washington DC musical duo The Electric Grandmother took their name from the film.

References

External links
 
 

American television films
Peabody Award-winning broadcasts
1982 films
Films based on works by Ray Bradbury
Films directed by Noel Black
1980s science fiction films
Robots in television
Films scored by John Morris
Films with screenplays by Ray Bradbury
Films based on science fiction short stories
NBC network original films
1980s English-language films